Tramo Street is a major local road in Pasay, Metro Manila, Philippines. It runs north-south from Ocampo Street in the border with Malate, Manila to Andrews Avenue in Maricaban. It is interrupted by Epifanio de los Santos Avenue (EDSA) and the MRT Line 3 line which divides the road into two sections, the southern section running from EDSA to Andrews Avenue having been renamed to Aurora Boulevard.

The street's name is Spanish for branch or line, referring to the Cavite Line which was a branch of the Manila tranvía (tramo del tranvía).

History
Tramo Street follows the abandoned line (the Cavite Line) of the Manila Railroad Company (now Philippine National Railways) that stretched from Paco all the way to Naic, Cavite. The Cavite Line was built in 1908 and train services ceased in 1936. Subsequent development of Manila International Airport led to the closure of a big segment of the old line in Pasay and Parañaque. The line resumes in La Huerta where it remains named as Tramo Road running  all the way to C-5 Extension in Las Piñas and continues as Fruto Santos Avenue. Streets of the same, also occupying the former right-of-way of the old railroad line, are found in Bacoor, Tanza, and Naic in Cavite.

Notes

References

Streets in Metro Manila